House Party: Tonight's the Night is a 2013 American direct-to-video comedy film. It is the fifth and final installment of the original House Party film series, and a direct continuation of the first three. It stars Tequan Richmond and Zac Goodspeed as two high school seniors who decide to throw a party while the parents are out of town. They are also seeking to get into the music industry. Rappers Kid 'n Play, who were the original stars of the first three films, make a special appearance in the film. The film is directed by Darin Scott.

Plot
Chris is ready to head to college. He realizes he will leave his best friend, Dylan and Autumn Rose, the girl he's had a crush on since the second grade. To get over his sadness about leaving Dylan and Autumn, Chris throws one last party that turns into a hilarious disaster.

Cast 

 Tequan Richmond as Chris Johnson
 Zac Goodspeed as Dylan
 Tristin Mays as Autumn Rose
 Gary Anthony Williams as Melvin Johnson
 Jacqui Achilleas as Mimi Johnson
 Rolonda Watts as Victoria
 Julie Hartley as Tracey
 Alex McGregor as Morgan
 Keith Powers as Quentin
 Kid and Play  as Themselves

Production
On August 30, 2012, Tambay A. Obenson, of Indiewire, reported that the Hudlin Brothers and Kid N' Play would not be in the film. The latter report proved to be false as Kid N' Play do appear in the film. On August 31, 2012, Stan Castle, of Atlanta Black Star, reported that Darin Scott, Don D. Scott, and Doug McHenry would direct, write, and produce the film respectively. Filming began on September 24, 2012. The movie was filmed in South Africa.

Music
Dangerous – Written by Melody Verdugo, Colton Fisher, & Jason Rabinowitz – Performed by Chanel Leon
Night Will Never End – Written by Lauren Vogel and Eric Goldman – Performed by Lauryn Vyce

Release

Home media
On August 30, 2012, Warner Bros. announced that they would make a fifth film in the series, and it would be released direct-to-video by Warner Bros.' Warner Premiere. The film was released on DVD July 23, 2013.

Reception

Critical response
Nathaniel Stevens, of Digital Chumps, writes: "This movie isn't bad because of the content of the film. The first film by the same name was basically the same premise and was a huge hit back in 1990 (or at least it did very well for the type of budget it was shot on). Having said that, it's obvious that the formula works and has been done over and over again through many different movies. You lay down the main premise that there is going to be a huge party then you sprinkle it with plot points. Again, it's been done and has succeeded several times over. The main issue with House Party: Tonight's the Night is that all the plot points in the film are either shallow in terms of setup, or they just pop them in as time fillers. There's nothing particularly coherent about this film that screams 'solid'."

Reboot
SpringHill Entertainment developed a sixth House Party film that will serve as a reboot to the series, as opposed to another sequel. Originally set for a VOD release from HBO Max, it was further delayed due to Warner Bros. Discovery's corporate resturcturing, thus delaying it for a theatrical release in December 9, 2022, before delaying it to a Martin Luther King Jr. release on January 13, 2023. As with the previous films, it received negative reviews.

References

External links
 

2013 films
2010s buddy comedy films
American buddy comedy films
Warner Bros. films
Warner Bros. direct-to-video films
Direct-to-video sequel films
Direct-to-video comedy films
House Party films
2013 comedy films
2010s English-language films
Films directed by Darin Scott
2010s American films